The Women's 400m individual medley event at the 2010 South American Games was held on March 27, with the heats at 11:22 and the Final at 18:30.

Medalists

Records

Results

Heats

Final

References
Heats
Final

Medley 400m W